Meganola dentata, the toothed meganola moth, is a species of nolid moth in the family Nolidae. It is found in North America.

The MONA or Hodges number for Meganola dentata is 8986.

References

Further reading

 
 
 

Nolinae
Articles created by Qbugbot
Moths described in 1899